Yanuca Lailai (also known as Lost Island to travellers) is a , volcanic rock, limestone island located between the islands of Ovalau and Moturiki in Fiji. The coastline has mangrove trees, volcanic rock cliffs and beaches, and the interior abounds in jungle.

The island is uninhabited, but has a tourist resort. The island was used as quarantine station when the first Indian indentured labourers arrived in the Leonidas.

See also

 Desert island
 List of islands

External links
LOST ISLAND - Fiji Islands

Uninhabited islands of Fiji
Lomaiviti Province
Private islands of Fiji